Z3, also known as the Z3 Theorem Prover, is a cross-platform satisfiability modulo theories (SMT) solver by Microsoft.

Overview
Z3 was developed in the Research in Software Engineering (RiSE) group at Microsoft Research and is targeted at solving problems that arise in software verification and program analysis. Z3 supports arithmetic, fixed-size bit-vectors, extensional arrays, datatypes, uninterpreted functions, and quantifiers. Its main applications are extended static checking, test case generation, and predicate abstraction.

In 2015, it received the Programming Languages Software Award from ACM SIGPLAN. In 2018, Z3 received the Test of Time Award from the European Joint Conferences on Theory and Practice of Software (ETAPS). Microsoft researchers Nikolaj Bjørner and Leonardo de Moura received the 2019 Herbrand Award for Distinguished Contributions to Automated Reasoning in recognition of their work in advancing theorem proving with Z3.

Z3 was open sourced in the beginning of 2015. The source code is licensed under MIT License and hosted on GitHub.
The solver can be built using Visual Studio, a Makefile or using CMake and runs on Windows, FreeBSD, Linux, and macOS.

It has bindings for various programming languages including C, C++, Java, Julia, Haskell, Rust, OCaml, Python, WebAssembly, and .NET/Mono. The default input format is SMTLIB2.

Examples

Propositional and predicate logic
In this example propositional logic assertions are checked using functions to represent the propositions a and b. The following Z3 script checks to see if :

 (declare-fun a  Bool)
 (declare-fun b Bool)
 (assert (not (= (not (and a b)) (or (not a)(not b)))))
 (check-sat)

Result:
 unsat

Note that the script asserts the negation of the proposition of interest. The unsat result means that the negated proposition is not satisfiable, thus proving the desired result (De Morgan's laws).

Solving equations
The following script solves the two given equations, finding suitable values for the variables a and b:

 (declare-const a Int)
 (declare-const b Int)
 (assert (= (+ a b) 20))
 (assert (= (+ a (* 2 b)) 10))
 (check-sat)
 (get-model)

Result:
 sat
 (model 
   (define-fun b Int
     -10)
   (define-fun a  Int
     30)
 )

See also

 Formal verification
 Alt-Ergo

References

Further reading
 
 Dennis Yurichev - SAT/SMT by Example - With many examples using Z3Py.
 Solving Classic, Giant and other Sudoku using an SMT (Integer) Using a SMT (Integer) solver like Z3
 Solving Queens placement puzzle on chess board Using an SMT (Integer) solver like Z3.

External links
 
 Z3 online playground
 The inner magic behind the Z3 theorem prover

Free and open-source software
Free software programmed in C++
Microsoft free software
Microsoft Research
SMT solvers
Software using the MIT license
2012 software